Himantolophus rostratus is a species of footballfish, a type of anglerfish. The fish is both mesopelagic and bathypelagic and can be found in the Atlantic and Pacific Oceans.

References

Himantolophidae
Deep sea fish
Fish described in 1925
Taxa named by Charles Tate Regan